Mount Adams is a mountain in the West Coast region of New Zealand's South Island. The summit is roughly 19 km south of Harihari and reaches  in height.

Mount Adams lies to the west of the main divide of the Southern Alps and drains into the Whataroa and Poerua catchments. Both of these rivers flow westwards to the Tasman Sea. There are two small glaciers on the south-eastern slopes that drain the summit ice cap; the Escape Glacier (about 2.1 km in length) and the Siege Glacier (about 3.6 km).

Climate 

This area, like much of the West Coast region, is subject to high precipitation by world standards.

Geology 

The Alpine Fault runs across the lower North-western slopes of the mountain near the edge of the coastal outwash plain, and is the boundary between the Pacific and Indo-Australian tectonic plates. Mount Adams itself is composed primarily of schist of Permian–Triassic (depositional) age, which is increasingly metamorphosed closer to the Alpine Fault.

The dam failed six days later during heavy rain. Fears of major damage did not turn into reality when the dam was breached, though significant quantities of coarse gravel were deposited downstream and the river's path was changed in places.

Access 

Mount Adams is unique in that it is one of the only glaciated peaks situated on or to the west of the main divide that is accessible as a weekend trip from a west coast road end. The standard route to the summit starts from a hidden layby off SH6 and heads up Dry Creek/Little Man River to a steep spur where a marked route starts. The marked route ends at the bushline and the remainder of the climb is on tussock, rock, and eventually the summit ice cap glacier.

Although this route is technically not difficult, it involves multiple river crossings, off track travel up Dry Creek/Little Man River and above the bushline, and glacial travel requiring an ice axe and crampons. Most parties take two days to summit and return to SH6, though it is possible in a long summer day.

References 

Westland District
Mountains of the West Coast, New Zealand
Southern Alps